Minuscule 297 (in the Gregory-Aland numbering), ε 1200 (Soden), is a Greek minuscule manuscript of the New Testament, on parchment. Palaeographically it has been assigned to the 12th century. 
It has marginalia

Description 

The codex contains a complete text of the four Gospels on 196 parchment leaves. The text is written in one column per page, in 28 lines per page.

On leaf 186 it has some excerpts from Gerasimus.

Text 

The Greek text of the codex is a representative of the Byzantine text-type. Aland placed it in Category V.
According to the Claremont Profile Method it represents textual family Kx in Luke 1; in Luke 10 it has mixed Byzantine text, in Luke 20 it has mixed text.

The text of the Pericope Adulterae (John 7:53-8:11) is omitted, but it was supplied by a later hand.

History 

The manuscript was added to the list of New Testament manuscripts by Scholz (1794-1852).
It was examined and described by Paulin Martin. C. R. Gregory saw in 1885.

The manuscript is currently housed at the Bibliothèque nationale de France (Suppl. Gr. 140) at Paris.

See also 

 List of New Testament minuscules
 Biblical manuscript
 Textual criticism

References

Further reading 

 

Greek New Testament minuscules
12th-century biblical manuscripts
Bibliothèque nationale de France collections